Baioglossa is an Australian genus of moths of the family Oecophoridae.

There is only one species in this genus: Baioglossa anisopasta (Turner 1935).

References
Common, 2000. Oecophorine Genera of Australia III. The Barea Group and Unplaced Genera (Lepidoptera: Oecophoridae). - 1-469.

Oecophoridae